Gendai-geki (現代劇) is a genre of film and television or theater play in Japan. Unlike the jidai-geki genre of period dramas, whose stories are set in the Edo period, gendaigeki stories are contemporary dramas set in the modern world.

See also
Sewamono (世話物) - the contemporary setting plays of bunraku and kabuki
Cinema of Japan
Shomin-geki
Jidai-geki

Film genres
Japanese entertainment terms